Johan Erik Vesti Boas (2 July 1855 – 25 January 1935), also J.E.V. Boas, was a Danish zoologist and a disciple of Carl Gegenbaur and Steenstrup. During the beginning and end of his career, Johan Erik Vesti Boas worked at the Zoological Museum of Copenhagen. However, during an intervening period of 35 years, Boas worked with the Veterinary and Agricultural University of Copenhagen, because Boas had felt ignored at the appointment of the museum curator post, which went, instead, to G.M.R. Levinsen (q.v.).

 Trizocheles boasi Forest, 1987
 Paromolopsis boasi

References

External links 

Danish zoologists
1855 births
1935 deaths